Pascal Vittori (born 16 August 1966, in Nouméa) is a New Caledonian politician.  He is a member of the Future Together party, of which he serves as secretary.  Since 2008, he has served as the New Centre's representative in New Caledonia.  In 2004, he replaced Marie-Noëlle Thémereau in the Congress of New Caledonia.

In 2020, he was elected mayor of Bouloupari.

References

1966 births
Living people
People from Nouméa
Union for French Democracy politicians
The Centrists politicians
Members of the Congress of New Caledonia